The 1929 Northern Ireland general election was held on 22 May 1929. Like all previous elections to the Parliament of Northern Ireland, it produced a large majority for the Ulster Unionist Party. It was the first held after the abolition of proportional representation and the redrawing of electoral boundaries to create single-seat constituencies. As with the rest of the United Kingdom, this has made it more difficult for independent and minor party candidates to win seats.

Results

|}

Electorate: 775,307 (432,439 in contested seats); Turnout: 67.6% (292,218). Ulster Liberal Party result is compared to Unbought Tenants' Association in 1925.

Votes summary

Seats summary

Old Map

Footnotes

References
Northern Ireland Parliamentary Election Results 

1929
Northern Ireland general election
Northern Ireland general election
1929 elections in Northern Ireland